Full Moon Fever is the debut solo studio album by Tom Petty, released on April 24, 1989, by MCA Records. It features contributions from members of his band the Heartbreakers, notably Mike Campbell, as well as Jeff Lynne, Roy Orbison (who died prior to its release), and George Harrison, Petty's bandmates in the Traveling Wilburys. The record shows Petty exploring his musical roots with nods to his influences. The songwriting is mainly collaborations between Petty and Lynne, who was also a producer on the album. Full Moon Fever became a commercial and critical success, peaking at No. 3 on the U.S. Billboard 200 and being certified 5× platinum in the United States and 6× platinum in Canada.

MCA Records under Irving Azoff originally refused to issue the album, believing it did not contain any hits. Azoff resigned within a few months, and new label management reviewed the album positively, and released it. In 2019, the album was inducted into the Grammy Hall of Fame.

Background and recording
Having earlier in 1987 finished a Heartbreakers tour behind the album Let Me Up (I've Had Enough), Petty decided to record a solo album without the Heartbreakers (similar to the arrangement between Bruce Springsteen and The E Street Band at the time).  This stirred some controversy among members of the Heartbreakers, although all but drummer Stan Lynch contributed to the album. Benmont Tench and Howie Epstein initially were not happy about playing the Full Moon Fever songs live during Heartbreakers concerts. Lynch hated playing them right up until his departure from the band, saying it made him feel like he was in a cover band.

The recording process in 1988 was a low-key affair, with many of Petty's friends contributing, including the members of the Traveling Wilburys, minus Bob Dylan. Recorded mainly in the relaxed atmosphere of Mike Campbell's garage studio, Petty would later say it was the most enjoyable record of his career. Recording of Full Moon Fever was actually interrupted to allow time for recording of the first Wilburys' album. Two songs recorded during the sessions did not make the Full Moon Fever album. "Down the Line" and "Don't Treat Me Like a Stranger" were released as B-sides. During the sessions, Petty wrote "Indiana Girl", an early draft of what would eventually become "Mary Jane's Last Dance".

Musical style and themes
The album is noted for being heavily influenced by Jeff Lynne, resulting in a cleaner and glossier version of the Heartbreakers' roots rock from previous albums. Lynne incorporated layers of keyboards and backing vocals, giving it a Beatlesque feel. The songs show Petty paying dues to his influences with a Byrds cover ("I'll Feel a Whole Lot Better") and a nod to Del Shannon in "Runnin' Down a Dream". Other songs, such as "Free Fallin'", show Petty addressing nostalgia on his rise to fame. "A Mind With a Heart of Its Own" uses a Bo Diddley-style rhythm, while "The Apartment Song" features an instrumental break with paradiddle drumming reminiscent of Buddy Holly's "Peggy Sue".

Release and reception

The album, which became Petty's commercial peak as an artist, was helped by favorable critical reviews and three hit singles. The album was released on April24, 1989 and rose to eventually peak at No.3 on the U.S. Billboard 200 and No.8 in the UK. Five singles were released from the album; two hit the top 20 of the U.S. Billboard Hot100 and three topped the U.S. Mainstream Rock chart. The RIAA certified Full Moon Fever 5× platinum on October5, 2000 in the US and the CRIA certified it 6× platinum on September18, 1991 in Canada.

Critical praise was generally high, with AllMusic giving the album four and a half stars out of five in a retrospective review, admiring the craft of the album and rivaling it with the Heartbreakers' Damn the Torpedoes. This review notes there are no weak tracks on the album, calling it a "minor masterpiece". The original Rolling Stone review compared the album favorably to the Traveling Wilburys' debut, Traveling Wilburys Vol. 1, saying it has the "same restless charm", but commenting that Full Moon Fever at times seems "sprawling". The review claims the album is "another rewarding, low-key side project for Petty", giving it three-and-a-half stars out of five. A later Rolling Stone biographer claims Full Moon Fever was a "masterful solo album". It was ranked number 92 on Rolling Stones list of the 100 best albums of the 1980s, and was ranked number 298 in the 2020 update of the magazine's list of the 500 greatest albums of all time.
In 2000 it was voted number534 in Colin Larkin's All Time Top 1000 Albums.

Track listing

"Hello, CD listeners ..." 
The original compact-disc release of the album contains a hidden track in the pregap of Track 6 ("Feel a Whole Lot Better"), at the point where cassette or LP listeners would have to flip sides to continue. The track consists of a brief tongue-in-cheek monologue by Petty, over a background of barnyard noises (credited to Del Shannon). The interlude is not included in other physical versions of the album, though it is mentioned (as "Attention CD Listeners") in the album credits in all versions.

Personnel
Tom Petty – lead and backing vocals, 6 and 12 string acoustic and electric guitars, keyboards, tambourine, handclaps 
Mike Campbell – lead guitar, bass guitar, mandolin, slide guitar, Dobro, keyboards
Jeff Lynne – bass guitar, rhythm guitar, guitar synthesizer, piano, keyboards, backing vocals, handclaps 
Phil Jones – drums, percussion

Additional musicians
George Harrison – acoustic guitar and backing vocals on "I Won't Back Down"
Jim Keltner – drums, maracas and tambourine on "Love Is a Long Road"
Benmont Tench – piano on "The Apartment Song"
Howie Epstein – backing vocals on "I Won't Back Down" and "Love Is a Long Road"
Roy Orbison – backing vocals on "Zombie Zoo"
Kelsey Campbell – scream on "Zombie Zoo"
Alan Weidel - handclaps on "Feel a Whole Lot Better"
Del Shannon – barnyard noises in the "Hello, CD listeners ..." interlude

Production
Produced by Jeff Lynne with Tom Petty and Mike Campbell
Engineers: Mike Campbell, Don Smith, and Bill Bottrell; Dennis Kirk on "Love Is a Long Road"
Assistant engineer: Alan "Bugs" Weidel
Mastered by Steve Hall

Charts

Weekly charts

Year-end charts

Singles

Certifications

References

1989 debut albums
Tom Petty albums
Grammy Hall of Fame Award recipients
Albums produced by Tom Petty
Albums produced by Jeff Lynne
MCA Records albums
Albums recorded at Sunset Sound Recorders
Albums recorded at Sound City Studios
Albums produced by Mike Campbell (musician)